{{DISPLAYTITLE:C7H8S}}
The molecular formula C7H8S (molar mass: 124.20 g/mol, exact mass: 124.0347 u) may refer to:

 Thioanisole
 Benzyl mercaptan (phenylmethanethiol)

Molecular formulas